XHDI-FM/XEDI-AM is a radio station on 88.5 FM and 1360 AM in Chihuahua City, Chihuahua, Mexico. XHDI/XEDI carries the @FM contemporary hit radio format from Grupo Radiorama.

External links
 Official website

References

1971 establishments in Mexico
Contemporary hit radio stations in Mexico
Grupo Radiorama
Mass media in Chihuahua City
Radio stations established in 1971
Radio stations in Chihuahua
Spanish-language radio stations